Mount Hoegh is a mountain,  high, standing  south-southeast of Duthiers Point on the west coast of Graham Land, Antarctica. It was charted by the Belgian Antarctic Expedition under Gerlache, 1897–99. It was named by the UK Antarctic Place-Names Committee in 1960 for Emil von Hoegh (1865–1915), a German mathematical optician who designed the first double anastigmatic camera lens in 1893.

References

Mountains of Graham Land
Danco Coast